Gavin Lee (born in Singapore) is a Singaporean football coach who is the current head coach of Tampines Rovers FC in Singapore.

Career
Lee joined the JSSL Singapore when he was 18 as a "cone guy" before becoming the general manager in 2016.

Playing career
Lee played for the national under-14 team.

Coaching career
Lee was Warriors FC's assistant coach in their title winning season in 2014. Lee left the club in 2015.  

In 2018, he joined Tampines Rovers as an assistant coach. The following year, in 2019, he became their head coach despite lacking the required Asian Football Confederation 'A' License to become the head coach.

Lee was appointed as head coach based on his past performance as Warriors FC's assistant coach and impressed Tampines Rovers' staff and players with his knowledge.

He would then led the club to second place in the Singapore Premier League and won the Singapore Cup in his first season in charge.

Education
Lee was a former student of Victoria School and Victoria Junior College. He later studied in Nanyang Technological University and had a degree in Sports Science and Management.

References

Singaporean football managers
Victoria School, Singapore alumni
Victoria Junior College alumni
Singaporean sportspeople of Chinese descent
Tampines Rovers FC head coaches
Year of birth missing (living people)
Living people